Harry Leslie Yeadon (28 May 1922 – 8 February 2015) was a British civil engineer. He had a pivotal role in creating the UK's first motorway.

References

1922 births
2015 deaths
British civil engineers
People educated at Accrington Grammar School
Alumni of the University of Manchester
British Army personnel of World War II
Royal Engineers officers